Thomas Khumba Wanyama (born 15 April 1989) is a Kenyan international footballer who plays for Mathare United, as a defender.

Career
Wanyama has played club football for Nairobi City Stars, Sofapaka and Mathare United. In October 2010, Wanyama went to France to trial with a number of teams.

He made his international debut for Kenya in 2012, earning two caps.

Personal life
Wanyama is brother to fellow players McDonald Mariga and Victor Wanyama.

References

1989 births
Living people
Kenyan footballers
Kenya international footballers
Nairobi City Stars players
Sofapaka F.C. players
Mathare United F.C. players
Kenyan Premier League players
Association football defenders
Footballers from Nairobi